Blueberry muffin may refer to
 A muffin with blueberry content
 A blueberry muffin baby, having skin purpura resembling the muffin